18th FAI World Precision Flying Championship took place between July 13 - July 19, 2008 in Ried im Innkreis in Austria, altogether with the 16th FAI World Rally Flying Championship (July 20-26).

There were 62 competitors from 13 countries: Czech Republic (10), Poland (9), Austria (9), France (6), United Kingdom (6), Russia (4), South Africa (4), New Zealand (3), Germany (3), Switzerland (3), Denmark (2), Sweden (2), Slovenia (1).

Most numerous airplane was Cessna 152 (31 pilots), then Cessna 150 (16) and Cessna 172 (6). There were also two Glastars and Zlin Z-43's, single Zlin Z-42, 3Xtrim, Piper PA-18, HB-23 and Van's RV-7A (the numbers of aircraft participating was lower, for some pilots flew the same aircraft).

Results

Individual

Team 
Number of penal points and place of three best competitors:
  - 612 pts
 Luboš Hájek - 110 pts, #1
 Michal Filip - 227 pts, #4
 Petr Opat - 275 pts, #6
  - 711 pts
 Wacław Wieczorek - 173 pts, #2
 Michał Wieczorek - 254 pts, #5
 Michał Bartler - 284 pts, #7
  - 1538 pts
 Patrick Bats	- 429 pts, #12
 Eric Daspet	- 505 pts, #15
 David Le Gentil - 604 pts, #23
 - 1849 pts
Anton Tonninger, jr. - 565 pts, #18
 Wolfgang Schneckenreither - 596 pts, #22
 Paul Szameitat - 688, #28
 - 3348 pts
 - 3562 pts
 - 3944 pts
 - 4212 pts
 - 5125 pts
 - 6590 pts

References
 18th FAI World Precision Flying Championship
Results

See also
17th FAI World Precision Flying Championship
16th FAI World Rally Flying Championship

Precision Flying 18
July 2008 events in Europe
2008 in Austria
Fédération Aéronautique Internationale
Aviation history of Austria
July 2008 sports events in Europe